Süleyman Şah, is one of the main characters in the first season of Turkish TV series, Diriliş: Ertuğrul, portrayed by Serdar Gökhan. He later appears as a guest character in later seasons, as well as in its sequel, Kuruluş: Osman, where he is played by the same actor. The character is based on Suleyman Shah, the possible grandfather of Osman I.

Background
Süleyman Şah was raised by his father Kaya Alp, along with his adoptive brothers Kurdoğlu and Alptekin. He inherited the Kayı Beylik upon his father's death, and fought in many wars alongside Kurdoğlu, and became blood brothers with him. He also married and had his first son Gündoğdu, before his first wife and two sons were killed by Mongols. Süleyman Şah eventually fell in love with Hayme Hatun, sister of Korkut Bey, of the Dodurga tribe, and married her. He was also forced to kill his adoptive brother Alptekin, after he started a rebellion and attempted to seize the Kayı Beylik, whilst he adopted Alptekin's daughters Selcan and Gökçe, as well as raising his son Ertuğrul's alps, Turgut, Bamsı and Doğan. His son Sungurtekin was also captured in a Mongol ambush at a relatively young age, and Süleyman did not get a chance to reunite with his son before his death.

Storyline

Season 1

In the first season, Süleyman Şah is depicted as the long-serving Bey of the Kayı tribe, struggling to combat the tribe's poverty and dealing with the ambition of his blood brother Kurdoğlu and son Gündoğdu. Due to these issues, he sends his son, Ertuğrul, to ask for land from the Emir of Aleppo. This is made almost impossible when the Kayı are put in a series of problems with the Templars after Ertuğrul saves Şehzade Numan, Halime Sultan, and Şehzade Yiğit, with Süleyman Şah's tribe being persecuted and Ertuğrul being imprisoned by the manipulated Emir, although Ertuğrul later shows him the truth. A problem also arises with Kurdoğlu, after he seeks his blood brother's Beylik with the help of the Templars and Süleyman's daughter-in-law Selcan Hatun, who wants revenge from Süleyman Şah as he killed her treacherous father, Alptekin Bey. Selcan's husband Gündoğdu also becomes jealous of his brother Ertuğrul as he is respected as the tribe hero but gradually calms down, and helps his father Süleyman Şah defeat Kurdoğlu's tricks and secures his father's Beylik. After Kurdoğlu briefly overthrows Süleyman and attempts to murder him, he is captured and beheaded by Ertuğrul, who later successfully defeats the Templars and captures their castle on his father's orders, and Selcan repents. This is followed by Süleyman Şah's death and the tribe's migration to Erzurum as part of Süleyman Şah's will before he died, whilst Süleyman nominates Ertuğrul as the tribe's Alpbaşı in his will.

Season 2–5 and Kuruluş: Osman

Süleyman Şah has a moderate influence on the plot of the second season, despite having died. The nomination of Korkut Bey's son Tuğtekin as Chief Alp overrides his will for Ertuğrul to take that position, angering Ertuğrul. He later appears in Ertuğrul's dreams during his visit to Bithynia, foretelling the greatness of Ertuğrul's future son Osman. He also appears in Ertuğrul's dreams as his first posthumous grandson Gündüz is born, giving him advice on fatherhood, whilst he appears in his widow Hayme's dreams, first assuring her whilst she is wounded, and later telling her to migrate with Ertuğrul to the west. Sungurtekin, having returned to the tribe, also expresses regret over not being able to reunite with his father, whilst Deli Demir and Hayme also express regret over no longer being under his rule. Eventually, Ertuğrul names his sons 'Gündüz', 'Savcı' and 'Osman' as per Süleyman Şah's will, whilst Gündoğdu and Selcan name their son 'Süleyman' in memory of him. In the fifth season, Süleyman Şah appears in his grandson Osman's dreams, giving him advice in Ertuğrul's marquee. In the sequel series Kuruluş: Osman, Süleyman's son Dündar is shown to be residing in his father's marquee, whilst Süleyman Şah again appears in Osman's dreams, telling him to 'wake up' to his surroundings. Eventually, Süleyman's sons Ertuğrul and Dündar inherit the boil disease that he died from, whilst Ertuğrul also dies due to this disease.

Positions
Süleyman Şah served as the long-term Bey of the Kayı tribe after his father Kaya Alp's death.

Reception
Diriliş: Ertuğrul was well received in Pakistan. On Twitter, Serdar Gökhan expressed his love and gratitude towards the Pakistani people and his wish to visit Pakistan. After one of his comments on Kuruluş: Osman and the lead actor Burak Özçivit were misunderstood, he had to say in another video about what he really meant.

See also 
List of Diriliş: Ertuğrul characters
List of Kuruluş: Osman characters

Notes

References 

Diriliş: Ertuğrul and Kuruluş: Osman characters
Fictional characters based on real people
Fictional commanders
Fictional lords and ladies
Fictional military strategists
Fictional politicians
Fictional tribal chiefs
Fictional Turkic people
Fictional Turkish people
Fictional war veterans
Male characters in television
Television characters introduced in 2014